Albin Killat (born January 1, 1961) is a retired diver from Germany, who is best known for twice winning the gold medal in the men's 3m springboard event at the European Championships (1987 and 1991).

Killat represented West Germany in two consecutive Summer Olympics, starting in 1984 (Los Angeles, California). He ended his Olympic career in 1992 as a member of the Unified German Team in Barcelona, Spain. He was affiliated with the Sportverein Münchener Sportclub 100 during his career.

References
 

1961 births
Living people
German male divers
Divers at the 1984 Summer Olympics
Divers at the 1988 Summer Olympics
Divers at the 1992 Summer Olympics
Olympic divers of Germany
Sportspeople from Munich
World Aquatics Championships medalists in diving
20th-century German people